Joshua Luis Wiener (born February 8, 1979), known by his stage name Josh Keaton, is an American actor. He is known for his many voice acting roles which have included Takashi 'Shiro' Shirogane in Voltron: Legendary Defender, Spider-Man in various media in addition to Electro in the video game Marvel's Spider-Man, Jack Darby in Transformers: Prime and the adolescent Hercules in Hercules. He was also the voice of Ryu Hayabusa in the console versions of Ninja Gaiden, and the voice of Revolver Ocelot in Metal Gear Solid 3: Snake Eater.
He is also the voice of King Anduin Wrynn in the MMORPG World of Warcraft.

Early life
Keaton was born outside of Los Angeles in Hacienda Heights, California on February 8, 1979, to a father from New York City, and a mother from Lima, Peru. He has three sisters: Danielle, Alitzah (Ali Navarro), and Sabrina. He is fluent in Spanish which he learned first as a child, and later English. As a child, he learned to speak some Quechua from his maternal grandparents. His father is Jewish and his mother is Catholic.

Career
His career has included television, video game and film work, with a mixture of live acting and voice work for animations. As an infant, he appeared in an OshKosh B'gosh commercial. He was in the 1990s boy band No Authority and was signed to MJJ Music and later RCA Records as a solo artist.

Keaton voiced Jules Brown in Back to the Future: The Animated Series during 1991–1992 and Major Ocelot during Metal Gear Solid 3: Snake Eater and Metal Gear Solid: Portable Ops.

From 2008 to 2009, he voiced Peter Parker / Spider-Man in The Spectacular Spider-Man animated series on The CW. He was originally supposed to voice the character in the 2002 Spider-Man video game but his voice work was scrapped and reworked as Harry Osborn / Green Goblin when Tobey Maguire came on to voice the character. He also reprised the role of New Goblin in the 2007 video game Spider-Man: Friend or Foe, and Spider-Man again in several video games (Spider-Man: Shattered Dimensions, Marvel vs. Capcom 3 and Spider-Man: Edge of Time). From 2017 to 2020, Keaton provided the voice of several recurring characters in Marvel's Spider-Man on Disney XD. He would also portray the villain Max Dillon / Electro in the 2018 Spider-Man video game developed by Insomniac Games, providing both the physical motion capture and voice for the character.

In 2011, Keaton was the voice for Spyro the Dragon in the Skylanders reboot of the franchise, Jack Darby and Tailgate on Transformers: Prime, and Hal Jordan / Green Lantern in Green Lantern: The Animated Series.

Since 2012, he is the voice for Anduin Wrynn in the video games World of Warcraft, Hearthstone and Heroes of the Storm.

At Wondercon 2016, it was announced that Keaton would play Shiro, one of the main characters of the Voltron animated series Voltron: Legendary Defender'' that premiered on June 10, exclusively on Netflix.

Filmography

Voice acting

Films

Animation

Video games

AudioBooks

Live-action

Films

Television

References

External links

 
 
 

1979 births
Living people
20th-century American Jews
American dance musicians
American impressionists (entertainers)
American male child actors
American male film actors
American male soap opera actors
American male television actors
American male video game actors
American male voice actors
American people of Peruvian descent
American people of Mestizo descent
American people of Basque descent
American people of German-Jewish descent
American people of Quechua descent
Hispanic and Latino American male actors
Disney people
Marvel Comics people
Male actors from Los Angeles
Male actors from Pasadena, California
Musicians from Los Angeles
Musicians from Pasadena, California
People from Hacienda Heights, California
20th-century American male actors
21st-century American male actors
21st-century American Jews